Tonmawr Junction railway station served the village of Tonmawr, in the historical county of Glamorganshire, Wales, from 1922 to 1930 on the South Wales Mineral Railway.

History 
The station was opened in November 1922, although it had opened as Tonmawr Halt to miners in 1920. It appeared earlier in the timetables, on 2 October 1922. Trains only served the station on Saturdays. It closed on 22 September 1930.

References 

Disused railway stations in Neath Port Talbot
Railway stations in Great Britain opened in 1922
Railway stations in Great Britain closed in 1930
1922 establishments in Wales
1930 disestablishments in Wales